Attorney General Morris may refer to:

Edward Morris, 1st Baron Morris (1859–1935), Attorney General of Newfoundland
Francis Asbury Morris (1817–1881), Attorney General of the Republic of Texas
James Morris (North Dakota judge) (1893–1980), Attorney General of North Dakota
John Morris, Baron Morris of Aberavon (born 1931), Attorney General for England and Wales, and Attorney General for Northern Ireland
Michael Morris, Baron Morris (1826–1901), Attorney-General for Ireland